My Way is the second solo album by bachata singer Henry Santos. This album included three singles that peaked in the Billboard Tropical Airplay chart. Its lead single, "My Way", which the album is name after, peaked at number 1. The second single, "Bésame Siempre", peaked at number 11. The third single, "La Vida", which featured Maffio, peaked at number 1 in 2014.

Track listing

Charts

References

2013 albums
Henry Santos albums
Universal Music Latin Entertainment albums
Spanish-language albums